The Third Course (1994) is a compilation of Blancmange singles, album and non album tracks.

Track listing
All songs written by Neil Arthur & Stephen Luscombe, except where noted.

CD:  550 194-2
 "Feel Me" – 5:07
 "I've Seen the Word" – 3:07
 "God's Kitchen" – 2:56
 "I Can't Explain" – 4:03
 "Waves" – 4:09
 "Lose Your Love" – 4:06
 "No Wonder They Never Made it Back" – 3:29
 "The Day Before You Came" (Andersson/Ulvaeus) – 4:27
 "All Things Are Nice (Version)" – 4:14
 "Running Thin" – 2:20
 "Game Above My Head" – 3:59
 "Wasted" – 4:20
 "Get Out of That" – 4:26
 "Lorraine's My Nurse" – 2:30

1994 compilation albums
Blancmange (band) compilation albums